There are currently about 2,300 mosques in France with a further 200 to 250 planned.

It is difficult to say when the first mosque in France was built. There is archaeological evidence of an eighth-century mosque in Narbonne, France. The Tsingoni Mosque in the overseas department of Mayotte was built in 1538.

The Mosque of the Bois de Vincennes was built in 1916 for temporary use during World War I, and disaffected in 1919. The Grand Mosque of Paris opened in 1926 retains iconic status and is one of the largest standing mosques in France.

See also
List of mosques (Selected mosques worldwide)
List of mosques in Europe
List of mosques in Germany
List of mosques in the United Kingdom

References 

Un annuaire des mosquées et lieux de cultes en France
Guide des mosquées en France

France
 
mosques